Kruisem is a municipality in the Belgian province of East Flanders that was established on 1 January 2019 from the merging of the municipalities of Kruishoutem and Zingem.

The merged municipality has an area of 71.59 km2 and a population of 15,876 people as of 2022. The municipality consists of the deelgemeentes Huise, Kruishoutem, Ouwegem,  and Zingem.

Creation

The Flemish Government provides incentives for municipalities to voluntarily merge. The municipal councils of Kruishoutem and Zingem approved a merge in 2017, which was ratified by Flemish decree of 4 May 2018 alongside several other merges, all to be effective per 1 January 2019.

As of 1 January 2018, the municipality of Kruishoutem had a population of 8,086 and Zingem a population of 7,552.

Government
The first elections for the new municipality were held during the regular local elections of 14 October 2018, electing a municipal council for the legislative period of 2019–2024. CD&V obtained a majority of seats in the municipal council (14 out of 25). Joop Verzele becomes mayor of Kruisem.

References

 
Municipalities of East Flanders
Populated places established in 2019
2019 establishments in Belgium